Teahitia ("Standing Fire") is a submarine volcano, located  northeast of the southeast tip of Tahiti of the Society Islands in the Pacific Ocean, with its peak 1600 meters below the water surface. It belongs to the Society hotspot. Teahitia's last eruption occurred in 1985.

The seamount has four prominent cones. Submersible dives in 1986 and 1989 found two active hydrothermal fields on the volcano's flanks. A further dive in 2013 found ongoing hydrothermal venting.

Earthquake swarms in March 1982, July 1983, December 1983, and January 1985 have been associated with submarine eruptions. On 16 March 2008 Teahitia was the epicentre of an earthquake measuring 3.2 on the Richter scale. The weak tremor was felt in Tahiti, causing the beginnings of panic in the population unaccustomed to these seismic phenomena and fearing a tidal wave.

References

Volcanoes of French Polynesia
Active volcanoes
Submarine volcanoes
Seamounts of the Pacific Ocean
Hotspot volcanoes